For Blood and Empire is the sixth studio album by the American punk rock band Anti-Flag. It was released on March 21, 2006. It was the band's first release on RCA Records, which caused the band to receive criticism from many due to their initially anti-corporate message.

Background
The booklet which comes with the CD contains a short essay for all but two songs ("State Funeral" and "Cities Burn") which gives more in-depth perspective on the inspirations for the song subjects such as the Downing Street Memo and Monsanto Company Corporation, as well as information on one of Anti-Flag's side projects, Military Free Zone. The CD also comes with two stencils, of the "Gunstar", a star formed with broken M-16s as seen on the cover of Mobilize, and the phrase "What are we going to do about the U.S.A.?".

Mike Ski of The A.K.A.s did the art direction, design and layout design for the album art.

The song "Emigre" (which on the promotional version was originally called "Exodus") includes an adaptation of Martin Niemöller's poem "First they came".

Songs from the album were used by several video games. "This is the End (For You My Friend)" is used in two EA Sports video games, Madden NFL 07 and NHL 07. "The Press Corpse" is used in the video games Tony Hawk's Downhill Jam and Shaun White Snowboarding.

By April 3, 2008, the album had sold 97,000 copies.

Track listing

Personnel
Justin Sane - guitar,  lead vocals on tracks 1, 2, 4, 5, 7, 9, 11, 13
Chris Head - guitar, backing vocals
Chris #2 - bass guitar, lead vocals on tracks 1, 3, 6, 8, 10, 12
Pat Thetic - drums, backing vocals

Charts

See also
Confessions of an Economic Hit Man (the book for which the song was named)
Lee Kyung Hae (Track 11 relates to his suicide at an anti-WTO protest)

References

External links
Essays from the CD booklet

Anti-Flag albums
2006 albums
RCA Records albums
Albums produced by David Schiffman